Cathy Dove is an American college administrator. She was educated at Georgetown University with a bachelor's degree. She holds an MBA from Cornell University and a doctorate in higher education management from the University of Pennsylvania. She served as vice president of Cornell Tech before she was named as 10th president of Paul Smith's College in 2014.

References

Georgetown University alumni
Samuel Curtis Johnson Graduate School of Management alumni
University of Pennsylvania Graduate School of Education alumni
Living people
Year of birth missing (living people)
Place of birth missing (living people)
Heads of universities and colleges in the United States